The Black War was a period of violent conflict between British colonists and Aboriginal Tasmanians in Tasmania from the mid-1820s to 1832. The conflict, fought largely as a guerrilla war by both sides, claimed the lives of 600 to 900 Aboriginal people and more than 200 European colonists. The near-destruction of the Aboriginal Tasmanians and the frequent incidence of mass killings have sparked debate among historians over whether the Black War should be defined as an act of genocide.

Background 
The terms "Black War" and "Black Line" were coined by journalist Henry Melville in 1835, but historian Lyndall Ryan has argued that it should be known as the Tasmanian War. She has also called for the erection of a public memorial to the fallen from both sides of the war.

The escalation of violence in the late 1820s prompted Lieutenant-Governor George Arthur to declare martial law—effectively providing legal immunity for killing Aboriginal people—and in November 1830 to order a massive six-week military offensive known as the Black Line, in which 2,200 civilians and soldiers formed a series of moving cordons stretching hundreds of kilometres across the island in order to drive Aboriginal people from the colony's settled districts to the Tasman Peninsula in the southeast, where it was intended they would remain permanently confined.

The Black War was prompted by the rapid spread of British settlers and agricultural livestock throughout areas of Tasmania that had been traditional Aboriginal hunting grounds. Historian Nicholas Clements has described the Aboriginal violence as a resistance movement—the use of force against an invading or occupying enemy. He said the Aboriginal attacks were motivated by revenge for European atrocities and the widespread kidnapping, rape and murder of Aboriginal women and girls by convicts, settlers and soldiers, but particularly from the late 1820s the Aboriginal people were also driven by hunger to plunder settlers' homes for food as their hunting grounds shrank, native game disappeared and the dangers of hunting on open ground grew. European violence, meanwhile, was motivated by mounting terror of Aboriginal attacks and a conviction that extermination of the Aboriginal population was the only means by which peace could be secured. Clements noted: "As black violence grew in intensity, so too did the frequency of revenge attacks and pre-emptive strikes by frontiersmen."

Attacks were launched by groups of Aboriginal people almost always in daylight with a variety of weapons including spears, rocks and waddies used to kill and maim settlers and shepherds, as well as their livestock, while homes, haystacks and crops were often set alight. European attacks, in contrast, were mainly launched at night or in the early hours of dawn by pursuit parties or roving parties of civilians or soldiers who aimed to strike as their quarry slept in bush camps. Women and children were commonly casualties on both sides.

From 1830 Arthur offered rewards for the capture of Aboriginal people, but bounties were also paid when Aboriginal people were killed. From 1829 efforts were made with the aid of humanitarian George Augustus Robinson to launch a "friendly mission" to persuade Aboriginal people to surrender and be removed to an island sanctuary; from November 1830 to December 1831 several groups accepted his offer and 46 were initially placed on Flinders Island, from which escape was deemed to be impossible. Although conflict between Aboriginal people and settlers almost completely ceased from January 1832, another 148 Aboriginal people were captured in the island's northwest over the next four years as a "cleanup" and forcibly removed to Hunter Island and then Flinders Island.

Early conflict 
Although sealers had begun commercial operations on Van Diemen's Land in late 1798, the first significant European presence on the island came five years later, with the establishment in September 1803 of a small military outpost at Risdon on the Derwent River near present-day Hobart. Several bloody encounters with local Aboriginal clans took place over the next five months, with shots fired and an Aboriginal boy abducted. David Collins arrived as the colony's first lieutenant governor in February 1804 with instructions from London that any acts of violence against the Aboriginal people by Europeans were to be punished, but failed to publish those instructions, leaving no legal framework on how to deal with any violent conflict.

On 3 May 1804, alarmed soldiers from Risdon fired grapeshot from a carronade on a group of about 100 Aboriginal people after an encounter at a farm, while settlers and convicts fired rifles, pistols, and muskets in support. Magistrate Robert Knopwood told a subsequent inquiry into the so-called Risdon massacre that five or six Aboriginal people had been killed, but other witnesses claimed as many as 50 men, women, and children had died, with 30 bodies later burned or buried to extinguish the odour as they decomposed.

A wave of violence erupted during a drought in 1806–7 as tribes in both the north and south of the island killed or wounded several Europeans in conflicts sparked by the competition for game, while explorer and naval officer John Oxley referred in an 1810 report to the "many atrocious cruelties" inflicted on Aboriginal people by convict bushrangers in the north, which in turn led to black attacks on solitary white hunters.

The arrival of 600 colonists from Norfolk Island between 1807 and 1813 increased tensions as they established farms along the River Derwent and east and west of Launceston, occupying 10 percent of Van Diemen's Land. By 1814 12,700ha of land was under cultivation, with 5,000 cattle and 38,000 sheep. The Norfolk Islanders used violence to stake their claim on the land, attacking Aboriginal camps at night, slaughtering parents, and abducting the orphaned children as their servants. The attacks prompted retaliatory raids on settlers' cattle herds in the southeast. Between 1817 and 1824 the colonial population rose from 2,000 to 12,600, and in 1823 alone more than 1000 land grants totalling 175,704ha were made to new settlers; by that year Van Diemen's Land's sheep population had reached 200,000 and the so-called Settled Districts accounted for 30 per cent of the island's total land area. The rapid colonisation transformed traditional kangaroo hunting grounds into farms with grazing livestock as well as fences, hedges and stone walls, while police and military patrols were increased to control the convict farm labourers.

Over the first two decades of settlement Aboriginal people launched at least 57 attacks on white settlers, punctuating a general calm, but by 1820 the violence was becoming markedly more frequent, with one Russian explorer reporting that year that "the natives of Tasmania live in a state of perpetual hostility against the Europeans". From the mid-1820s, the number of attacks initiated by both whites and blacks rose sharply. Clements says the main reasons for settler attacks on Aboriginal people were revenge, killing for sport, sexual desire for women and children and suppression of the native threat. Van Diemen's Land had an enormous gender imbalance, with male colonists outnumbering females six to one in 1822 and the ratio as high as 16 to one among the convict population. Clements has suggested the "voracious appetite" for native women was the most important trigger for the Black War. He wrote: "Sex continued to be a central motivation for attacking natives until around 1828, by which time killing the enemy had taken priority over raping them."

Crisis years, 1825–1831 
From 1825 to 1828, the number of native attacks more than doubled each year, raising panic among settlers. By 1828, says Clements, colonists had no doubt they were fighting a war—"but this was not a conventional war, and the enemy could not be combated by conventional means. The blacks were not one people, but rather a number of disparate tribes. They had no home base and no recognisable command structure."

George Arthur, Governor of the colony since May 1824, had issued a proclamation on his arrival that placed Aboriginal people under the protection of British law and threatened prosecution and trial for Europeans who continued to "wantonly destroy" them. Arthur sought to establish a "native institution" for Aboriginal people and in September 1826 expressed a hope that the trial and subsequent hanging of two Aboriginal people arrested for the spearing of three colonists earlier that year would "not only prevent further atrocities ... but lead to a conciliatory line of conduct". But between September and November 1826 six more colonists were murdered. Among them was George Taylor Junior, a "respectable settler" from Campbell Town, whose body was found "transfixed with many spears, and his head dreadfully shattered with blows, inflicted either with stones or waddies." The Colonial Times newspaper, in response, demanded a drastic change of official policy, urging the forcible removal of all Aboriginal people from the Settled Districts to an island in the Bass Strait. It warned: "Self-defence is the first law of nature. The government must remove the natives—if not, they will be hunted down like wild beasts, and destroyed!"

Responding to the rising panic, Arthur on 29 November 1826 issued a government notice setting out the legal conditions under which the colonists could kill Aboriginal people when they attacked settlers or their property. The notice declared that acts of aggression could be repelled "in the same as if they had proceeded from an accredited State". Though the notice was greeted by the Colonial Times as a declaration of war on Aboriginal people in the Settled Districts, and some settlers saw it as "a noble service to shoot them down", Clements believes that the legality of killing blacks was never made clear to colonists and historian Lyndall Ryan has argued that Arthur intended nothing more than to force their surrender.

Over the summer of 1826–7 clans from the Big River, Oyster Bay and North Midlands nations speared a number of stock-keepers on farms and made it clear that they wanted the settlers and their sheep and cattle to move from their kangaroo hunting grounds. Settlers responded vigorously, resulting in many mass-killings, though this was poorly reported at the time. On 8 December 1826 a group led by Kickerterpoller threatened a farm overseer at Bank Hill farm at Orielton, near Richmond; the following day soldiers from the 40th Regiment killed 14 Aboriginal people from the Oyster Bay nation and captured and jailed another nine, including Kickerterpoller. In April 1827 two shepherds were killed at Hugh Murray's farm at Mount Augustus near Campbell Town, south of Launceston, and a party of settlers with a detachment of the 40th Regiment launched a reprisal attack at dawn on an undefended Aboriginal camp, killing as many as 70 Aboriginal men, women and children. In March and April several settlers and convict servants were killed and a pursuit party avenged one of the incidents in a dawn raid in which "they fired volley after volley in among the Blackfellows ... they reported killing some two score (40)." In May 1827 a group of Oyster Bay Aboriginal people killed a stock-keeper at Great Swanport near Swansea and a party of soldiers, field police, settlers and stock-keepers launched a night raid on the culprits' camp. A report noted: "Volley after volley of ball cartridge was poured in upon the dark groups surrounding the little camp fires. The number slain was considerable."

Over 18 days in June 1827 at least 100 members of the Pallittorre clan from the North nation were killed in reprisals for the killing of three stockmen and Ryan calculates that in the eight months from 1 December 1826 to 31 July 1827 more than 200 Aboriginal people were killed in the Settled Districts in reprisal for their killing of 15 colonists. An entire clan of 150 Oyster Bay people may have been killed in one pursuit through the Sorell Valley in November 1827, significantly reducing population numbers. In September Arthur appointed another 26 field police and deployed another 55 soldiers from the 40th Regiment and New South Wales Royal Veteran Company into the Settled Districts to deal with the rising conflict. Between September 1827 and the following March, at least 70 Aboriginal attacks were reported throughout the Settled Districts, taking the lives of 20 colonists. By March 1828 the death toll in the Settled Districts for the 16 months since Arthur's November 1826 official notice had risen to 43 colonists and probably 350 Aboriginal people. But by then reports were being received that Aboriginal people were more interested in plundering huts for food—stealing bread, flour, tea and digging up potatoes and turnips from settlers' gardens—than killing colonists.

Arthur reported to the Colonial Office secretary in London that the Aboriginal people "already complained that the white people have taken possession of their country, encroached upon their hunting grounds, and destroyed their natural food, the kangaroo" and in a memo he proposed settling the Aboriginal people "in some remote quarter of the island, which should be reserved strictly for them, and to supply them with food and clothing, and afford them protection ... on condition of their confining themselves peaceably to certain limits". He said Tasmania's northeast coast was the preferred location for such a reserve and suggested they remain there "until their habits shall become more civilised". He pursued the proposal by issuing on 19 April 1828 a "Proclamation Separating the Aborigines from the White Inhabitants" that divided the island into two parts to regulate and restrict contact between blacks and whites. The northeast region was an area traditionally visited by many groups for its rich food reserves, and rivers, estuaries and sheltered bays as well as its mild climate. It was also largely unoccupied by colonists. But the proclamation partitioning the island also provided the first official sanction of the use of force to expel any Aboriginal people from the Settled Districts. Historian James Boyce observed: "Any Aborigine could now be legally killed for doing no more than crossing an unmarked border that the government did not even bother to define."

In a letter to colonial officials in London in April 1828, Arthur admitted:

Arthur enforced the border by deploying almost 300 troops from the 40th and 57th Regiments at 14 military posts along the frontier and within the Settled Districts. The tactic appeared to deter Aboriginal attacks; through the winter of 1828 few Aboriginal people appeared in the Settled Districts, and those that did were driven back by military parties. Among them were at least 16 undefended Oyster Bay people who were killed in July at their encampment in the Eastern Tiers by a detachment of the 40th Regiment.

Martial law, November 1828 

Any hopes of peace in the Settled Districts were dashed in spring. Between 22 August and 29 October 15 colonists died in 39 Aboriginal attacks—about one every two days—as the Oyster Bay and Big River clans launched raids on stock huts, while Ben Lomond and North clans burned down stock huts along the Nile and Meander rivers in the east and west. From early October Oyster Bay warriors also began killing white women and children. Galvanised by the escalation of violence, Arthur called a meeting of Van Diemen's Land's Executive Council—comprising himself, the chief justice and the colonial treasurer—and on 1 November declared martial law against the Aboriginal people in the Settled Districts, who were now "open enemies of the King". Proclamation of martial law was a crown prerogative to be used "against rebels and enemies as a ... convenient mode of exercising a right to kill in war, a right originating in self-defence" and Arthur's move was effectively a declaration of total war. Soldiers now had the right to apprehend without warrant or to shoot on sight any Aboriginal person in the Settled Districts who resisted them, though the proclamation ordered settlers:

Martial law would remain in force for more than three years, the longest period of martial law in Australian history.

About 500 Aboriginal people from five clan groups were still operating in the Settled Districts when martial law was declared and Arthur's first action was to encourage civilian parties to begin capturing them. On 7 November a party operating from Richmond captured Umarrah—who was thought to have led a fatal attack on stockmen in the Norfolk Plains in February 1827—and four others including his wife and a child. Umarrah remained defiant and was placed in Richmond jail and remained there for a year. Arthur then established military patrols or "pursuing parties" of eight to 10 men from the 39th, 40th and 63rd Regiments who were ordered to remain in the field for about two weeks at a time, scouring the Settled Districts for Aboriginal people, whom they should capture or shoot. By March 1829, 23 military parties, a total of about 200 armed soldiers, were scouring the Settled Districts, mainly intent on killing, rather than capturing, their quarry. Aboriginal people were killed in groups of as large as 10 at a time, mainly in dawn raids on their camps or running them down in daylight, and by March press reports indicated that about 60 Aboriginal people had been killed since martial law had been declared, with the loss of 15 colonists.

The Aboriginal attacks fuelled settlers' anger and a craving for revenge, but according to Clements the primary emotion colonists experienced was fear, ranging from a constant unease to paralysing terror. He noted: "Everybody on the frontier was afraid, all the time." The financial loss from theft, destruction of stock and arson attacks was a constant threat: there were no insurance companies and settlers faced financial ruin if crops and buildings were burnt or their stock destroyed. The Hobart Town Courier newspaper warned that the Aboriginal people had declared a "war of extermination" on white settlers, while the Colonial Times declared: "The Government must remove the natives. If not they will be hunted down like wild beasts and destroyed."

By winter 1829 the southern part of the Settled Districts had become a war zone and Aboriginal people later identified campsites where their relatives had been killed and mutilated. Several more incidents were reported in which Aboriginal people were raiding huts for food and blankets or digging up potatoes, but they too were killed. In an effort to conciliate Aboriginal people, Arthur arranged for the distribution of "proclamation boards" comprising four panels that depicted white and black Tasmanians dwelling together peaceably, and also illustrated the legal consequences for members of either race that committed acts of violence—that an Aboriginal would be hanged for killing a white settler and a settler would be hanged for killing an Aboriginal person. No colonist was ever charged in Van Diemen's Land, or committed for trial, for assaulting or killing an Aboriginal person.

Aboriginal people maintained their attacks on settlers, killing 19 colonists between August and December 1829—the total for the year was 33, six more than for 1828. Among the white victims was a servant burned to death in a house at Bothwell and a settler mutilated. But the white response was even more vigorous, with the report after one expedition noting "a terrible slaughter" resulting from an overnight raid on a camp. In late February 1830 Arthur introduced a bounty of £5 for every captured Aboriginal and £2 per child, and also sought a greater military presence, trying to halt the departure to India of the last detachment of the 40th Regiment and requesting reinforcements from the 63rd Regiment in Western Australia, but without success. In April he also advised London that a significant boost to the convict population in remote frontier areas would help protect settlers and explicitly asked that all convict transport ships be diverted to Van Diemen's Land.

Aborigines Committee 
In March 1830 Arthur appointed Anglican Archdeacon William Broughton as chairman of a six-man Aborigines Committee to conduct an inquiry into the origin of the black hostility and recommend measures to stop the violence and destruction of property. Sixteen months had now passed since the declaration of martial law in November 1828 and in that time there had been 120 Aboriginal attacks on settlers, resulting in about 50 deaths and more than 60 wounded. Over the same period at least 200 Aboriginal people had been killed, with many of them in mass killings of six or more. Among submissions it received were suggestions to set up "decoy huts, containing flour and sugar, strongly impregnated with poison", that Aboriginal people be rooted out with bloodhounds and that Maori warriors be brought to Tasmania to capture the Aboriginal people for removal to New Zealand as slaves. Settlers and soldiers gave evidence of killings and atrocities on both sides, but the committee was also told that despite the attacks, some settlers believed very few Aboriginal people now remained in the Settled Districts. The inquiry was conducted in the context of a further escalation in hostilities: in February alone there were 30 separate incidents in which seven Europeans were killed.

In its report, published in March 1830, the committee noted that "It is manifest that (the Aboriginal people) have lost the sense of superiority of white men, and the dread of the effects of fire-arms" and were now on a systematic plan of attacking the settlers and their possessions. The committee's report supported the bounty system, recommended an increase in mounted police patrols and urged settlers to remain well armed and alert. Arthur, in turn, forwarded their report to Secretary of State for War and the Colonies Sir George Murray, pointing out that although "lawless convicts" and convict stock-keepers had acted with great inhumanity towards the black natives, "it is increasingly apparent the Aboriginal natives of this colony are, and have ever been, a most treacherous race; and that the kindness and humanity which they have always experienced from the free settlers has not tended to civilize them to any degree." Murray responded in a letter that it was possible that in the near future the entire "race" of Tasmanian Aborigines would extinct, and any lines of conduct aimed at the declared or occult extinction of the native population could leave an indelible stain on the British government's reputation.

News of friendly encounters with Aboriginal people and a season decline in attacks prompted Arthur on 19 August to issue a government notice expressing his satisfaction "a less hostile disposition" being displayed by the indigenous population and advising that settlers cautiously "abstain from acts of aggression against these benighted beings" and allow them to feed and depart. But still the attacks continued, however, and as public panic and anger mounted, the Executive Council met a week later and decided a full-scale military operation would be required to force an end to what threatened to become a "war of extermination" between settlers and the Big River and Oyster Bay people. Martial law was extended to the whole of Van Diemen's Land on 1 October and every able-bodied male colonist was ordered by Arthur to assemble on 7 October at one of seven designated places in the Settled Districts to join a massive drive to sweep "these miserable people" from the region. The campaign, which became known as the Black Line, was greeted enthusiastically by the colonist press. The Hobart Town Courier said it doubted settlers would need persuading "to accomplish the one grand and glorious object now before them".

North-west conflict 
Violence in the island's north-west, where the colonists were servants of the Van Diemen's Land Company, erupted in 1825, fuelled by disputes over Aboriginal women, who were often violated or abducted, and the destruction of kangaroo stocks. An escalating cycle of violence broke out in 1827 after white shepherds attempted to force themselves on black women; a shepherd was speared and more than 100 sheep killed in retribution and in turn a white party launched a dawn attack on an Aboriginal campsite, killing 12. The conflict led to the Cape Grim massacre of 10 February 1828 in which shepherds armed with muskets ambushed up to 30 Aboriginal people as they collected shellfish at the foot of a cliff.

On 21 August 1829 four company servants shot an Aboriginal woman in the back, then executed her with an axe at Emu Bay, near present-day Burnie. Violence continued in the region, with three company men fatally speared in July and October 1831 and heavy losses inflicted on sheep and oxen. The population of North West clans fell from 700 to 300 through the 1820s, while in the North nation—where shepherds vowed to shoot Aboriginal people whenever they saw them—numbers had plummeted from 400 in 1826 to fewer than 60 by mid-1830. Violence ceased in 1834 but resumed between September 1839 and February 1842 when Aboriginal people made at least 18 attacks on company men and property.

Black Line, October–November 1830 

The Black Line consisted of 2,200 men: about 550 soldiers—a little over half of the entire garrison in Van Diemen's Land—as well as 738 convict servants and 912 free settlers or civilians. Arthur, who maintained overall control, placed Major Sholto Douglas of the 63rd Regiment in command of the forces. Separated into three divisions and aided by Aboriginal guides, they formed a staggered front more than 300 km long that began pushing south and east across the Settled Districts from 7 October with the intention of forming a pincer movement to trap members of four of the nine Aboriginal nations in front of the line and drive them across the Forestier Peninsula to East Bay Neck and into the Tasman Peninsula, which Arthur had designated as an Aboriginal Reserve.

The campaign was beset by severe weather, rugged terrain, impenetrable scrub and vast swamps, inadequate maps and poor supply lines and although two of the divisions met in mid-October the hostile terrain soon resulted in the cordon being broken, leaving many wide gaps through which the Aboriginal people were able to slip. Many of the men, by then barefoot and their clothes tattered, deserted the line and returned home. The campaign's single success was a dawn ambush on 25 October in which two Aboriginal people were captured and two killed. The Black Line was disbanded on 26 November.

Ryan estimates that barely 300 Aboriginal people were still alive on the entire island, including 200 within the region in which the Black Line was operating. Yet they launched at least 50 attacks on settlers—both in front of and behind the line—during the campaign, often plundering huts for food.

Surrender and removal 
Colonists' hopes of peace rose over the summer of 1830-31 as Aboriginal attacks fell to a low level and the Colonial Times newspaper speculated that their enemy had either been wiped out or frightened into inaction. But the north remained a dangerous place: on 29 January a Dairy Plains woman was murdered—three months after her husband had died in a similar attack—and in March a mother carrying her infant was fatally speared while working in her garden on the East Tamar. Though the number of attacks in 1831 was less than a third of those the previous year—a total of 70, compared with 250 in 1830—settlers remained so fearful that many men refused to go out to work.

Yet, as the Aborigines Committee discovered in a new series of hearings, there was some positive news arising from the work of evangelical humanitarian George Augustus Robinson, who in 1829 had been appointed storekeeper at a ration depot for Aboriginal people on Bruny Island. From January 1830 Robinson had embarked on a series of expeditions across the island to make contact with Aboriginal people and in November he secured the surrender of 13 of them, prompting him to write to Arthur claiming he could remove "the entire black population", which he estimated to be 700. In a new report on 4 February 1831, the Aborigines Committee praised Robinson's "conciliatory mission" and his efforts to learn the local languages and "explain the kind and pacific intentions of the government and the settlers generally towards them". The committee recommended that Aboriginal people who surrendered should be sent to Gun Carriage Island in Bass Strait. But the committee also urged settlers to remain vigilant, recommending that parties of armed men should be stationed in the most remote stock huts. In response up to 150 stock huts were turned into ambush locations, military posts were established on native migratory routes and new barracks were built at Spring Bay, Richmond and Break O'Day Plains.

Arthur's conciliatory approach and his support for Robinson's "friendly mission" brought widespread condemnation from colonists and the settler press, which intensified after a series of violent mid-winter raids launched by evidently hungry, cold and desperate Aboriginal people in the Great Western Tiers in the island's northern highlands. Those raids culminated in the murder of Captain Bartholomew Thomas and his overseer James Parker at Port Sorell on the north coast on 31 August 1831. The killings would, in fact, turn out to be the last of the Black War, but they triggered an unprecedented surge of fear and anger, particularly because Thomas—the brother of the Colonial Treasurer—had been sympathetic towards Aboriginal people and had made attempts to conciliate the local indigenous population. The Launceston Advertiser declared that the only course left was the "utter annihilation" of Aboriginal population, while another newspaper expressed fears that the natives would resort to even greater atrocities in the coming season. Several weeks later a group robbed huts at Great Swansea, causing panic, and in late October 100 armed settlers formed a cordon across the narrow part of Freycinet Peninsula in an attempt to capture several dozen Aboriginal people who had passed on to the peninsula. The cordon was abandoned four days later after Aboriginal people slipped through and escaped at night.

On the 31st of December, 1831, Robinson and his group of about 14 black envoys negotiated the surrender of 28 members of the Mairremmener people, an amalgam of Oyster Bay and Big River tribes. The tiny group of 16 men, nine women and a child, led by Tongerlongeter and Montpelliatta, was all that remained of what had once been one of the island's most powerful clans and much of Hobart Town's population lined the streets as Robinson walked with them through the main street towards Government House. They were sent to the Wybalenna settlement on Flinders Island, joining another 40 Aboriginal people who had previously been captured, although another 20 interned on the island had earlier died. By late May many more, including Kickerterpoller and Umarrah, had also contracted influenza and died.

The December surrender effectively brought to a close the Black War. There were no further reports of violence in the Settled Districts from that date, although isolated acts of violence continued in the north-west until 1842.

Martial law was revoked in January 1832, two weeks after the well-publicised surrender, and the bounty on captured Aboriginal people was scrapped on 28 May 1832.

In February, 1832, Robinson embarked on the first of several expeditions to the west, north-west and the Launceston area to secure the surrender of remaining Aboriginal people, believing the strategy was "for their own good" and would save them from extermination at the hands of settlers while providing them with the benefits of British civilisation and Christianity. Warning that they faced violent hostility without protection, he persuaded several small groups to be transported to Flinders Island—where many died of pneumonia, influenza and catarrh—but from early 1833 began to use force to capture those who still lived freely in the north-east, despite the cessation of violence. Both Hunter Island, at Tasmania's north-west tip, and penal stations on islands in Macquarie Harbour, on the west coast, were used to detain captured Aboriginal people, where many succumbed quickly to disease and the mortality rate reached 75 percent. Robinson noted of conditions in the Macquarie Harbour penal stations: "The mortality was dreadful, its ravages was unprecedented, it was a dreadful calamity." In November, 1833, all surviving Aboriginal people were moved from Macquarie Harbour to Flinders Island.

By early 1835 almost 300 people had surrendered to Robinson, who reported to the colonial secretary: "The entire Aboriginal population is now removed", although in 1842 he located one remaining family near Cradle Mountain, who surrendered. Men on the island were expected to clear forest land, build roads, erect fences and shear sheep, while women were required to wash clothes, attend sewing classes and attend classes. All were expected to wear European clothes and many women were given European names. A high rate of infectious disease at the Wybalenna settlement on Flinders Island cut the population from about 220 in 1833 to 46 in 1847.

Death toll 
Estimates of Tasmania's Aboriginal population in 1803, the year of the first British arrivals, range from 3,000 to 7,000. Lyndall Ryan's analysis of population studies led her to conclude that there were about 7,000 spread throughout the island's nine nations; However, Nicholas Clements, citing research by N.J.B Plomley and Rhys Jones, settled on a figure of 3,000 to 4,000.

But Aboriginal numbers began dropping almost immediately: violent encounters were reported in the Hobart region, while at Port Dalrymple in the colony's north, Lieutenant-Governor William Paterson is thought to have ordered soldiers to shoot at Aboriginal people wherever they were found, leading to the virtual disappearance of North Midlands clans in that region after 1806. In 1809 New South Wales surveyor-general John Oxley reported that kangaroo hunting by whites had led to a "considerable loss of life among the natives" throughout the colony. One settler, the convict adventurer Jørgen Jørgensen, also claimed that Aboriginal numbers were "much reduced during the first six or seven years of the colony" as whites "harassed them with impunity". By 1819 the Aboriginal and British population reached parity with about 5,000 of each, although among the colonists men outnumbered women four to one. At that stage both population groups enjoyed good health, with infectious diseases not taking hold until the late 1820s.

Ryan accepts a figure of 1,200 Aboriginal people dwelling in the Settled Districts in 1826 at the start of the Black War, while Clements believes the number in the eastern part of Tasmania was about 1,000.

Historians have differed in their estimates of the total number of fatalities in the Black War and acknowledge that most killings of Aboriginal people went unreported. The Colonial Advocate newspaper reported in 1828 that "up country, instances occur where the Natives are 'shot like so many crows', which never come before the public'." The table above, depicting fatalities among Aboriginal people and colonists, is based on statistics in Ryan's account of the conflict in the Settled Districts.

About 100 Tasmanian Aboriginal people survived the conflict and Clements—who calculates that the Black War began with an indigenous population of about 1,000—has therefore concluded 900 died in that time. He surmises that about one-third may have died through internecine conflict, disease and natural deaths, leaving a "conservative and realistic" estimate of 600 who died in frontier violence, though he admits: "The true figure might be as low as 400 or as high as 1,000."

Genocide controversy 
The near-destruction of Tasmania's Aboriginal population has been described as an act of genocide by historians including Robert Hughes, James Boyce, Lyndall Ryan, Tom Lawson, Mohamed Adhikari, Benjamin Madley, and Ashley Riley Sousa. The author of the concept of genocide, Raphael Lemkin, considered Tasmania the site of one of the world's clear cases of genocide and Hughes has described the loss of Aboriginal Tasmanians as "the only true genocide in English colonial history". However, other historians including Henry Reynolds, Richard Broome, and Nicholas Clements do not agree with the genocide thesis, arguing that the colonial authorities did not intend to destroy the Aboriginal population in whole or in part.

Boyce has claimed that the April 1828 "Proclamation Separating the Aborigines from the White Inhabitants" sanctioned force against Aboriginal people "for no other reason than that they were Aboriginal". However, as Reynolds, Broome and Clements point out, there was open warfare at the time. Boyce describes the decision to remove all Aboriginal Tasmanians after 1832—by which time they had given up their fight against white colonists—as an extreme policy position. He concludes: "The colonial government from 1832 to 1838 ethnically cleansed the western half of Van Diemen's Land and then callously left the exiled people to their fate."

As early as 1852 John West's History of Tasmania portrayed the obliteration of Tasmania's Aboriginal people as an example of "systematic massacre" and in the 1979 High Court case of Coe v Commonwealth of Australia, judge Lionel Murphy observed that Aboriginal people did not give up their land peacefully and that they were killed or forcibly removed from their land "in what amounted to attempted (and in Tasmania almost complete) genocide".

Historian Henry Reynolds says there was a widespread call from settlers during the frontier wars for the "extirpation" or "extermination" of the Aboriginal people. But he has contended that the British government acted as a source of restraint on settlers' actions. Reynolds says there is no evidence the British government deliberately planned the wholesale destruction of indigenous Tasmanians—a November 1830 letter to Arthur by Sir George Murray warned that the extinction of the race would leave "an indelible stain upon the character of the British Government"—and therefore what eventuated does not meet the definition of genocide codified in the 1948 United Nations convention. He says Arthur was determined to defeat the Aboriginal people and take their land, but believes there is little evidence he had aims beyond that objective and wished to destroy the Tasmanian race. In contrast to Reynolds' argument, historian Lyndall Ryan, based on a sample of massacres taking place in the Meander River region in June 1827, concludes that massacres of Aboriginal Tasmanians by white settlers were likely part of an organised process and were sanctioned by government authorities.

Clements accepts Reynolds' argument but also exonerates the colonists themselves of the charge of genocide. He says that unlike genocidal determinations by Nazis against Jews in World War II, Hutus against Tutsis in Rwanda and Ottomans against Armenians in present-day Turkey, which were carried out for ideological reasons, Tasmanian settlers participated in violence largely out of revenge and self-preservation. He adds: "Even those who were motivated by sex or morbid thrillseeking lacked any ideological impetus to exterminate the natives." He also argues that while genocides are inflicted on defeated, captive or otherwise vulnerable minorities, Tasmanian natives appeared as a "capable and terrifying enemy" to colonists and were killed in the context of a war in which both sides killed noncombatants.

Lawson, in a critique of Reynolds' stand, argues that genocide was the inevitable outcome of a set of British policies to colonise Van Diemen's Land. He says the British government endorsed the use of partitioning and "absolute force" against Tasmanians, approved Robinson's "Friendly Mission" and colluded in transforming that mission into a campaign of ethnic cleansing from 1832. He says that once on Flinders Island, indigenous peoples were taught to farm land like Europeans and worship God like Europeans and concludes: "The campaign of transformation enacted on Flinders Island amounted to cultural genocide."

Historical dispute 
The conflict has been a controversial area of study by historians, even characterised as among Australia's history wars. Geoffrey Blainey wrote that, in Tasmania, by 1830: "Disease had killed most of them but warfare and private violence had also been devastating." Josephine Flood wrote: "The catastrophic death rate was due to new diseases, particularly pulmonary and sexually transmitted ones." Keith Windschuttle in his 2002 work, The Fabrication of Aboriginal History, Volume One: Van Diemen's Land 1803–1847, questioned the historical evidence used to identify the number of Aboriginal people killed and the extent of conflict. He stated his belief that it had been exaggerated and he challenged what is labelled the "Black armband view of history" of Tasmanian colonisation. Windschuttle argued that there were only 2000 Aboriginal people in Tasmania at the moment of colonisation, that they had an internally dysfunctional society with no clear tribal organisation or connection to the land and were politically incapable of conducting a guerrilla war with the settlers. He argued they were more like "black bushrangers" who attacked settlers' huts for plunder and were led by "educated black terrorists" disaffected from white society. He concluded that two colonists had been killed for every Aboriginal person and there was only one massacre of Aboriginal people. He also claimed that the Aboriginal Tasmanians, by prostituting the women tribe members to sealers and stock-keepers, by catching European diseases, and through intertribal warfare, were responsible for their own demise. His argument in turn has been challenged by a number of authors, including S.G. Foster in Quadrant, Lyndall Ryan and Nicholas Clements.

See also 
 List of massacres of Indigenous Australians
 Trugernanner & Fanny Cochrane Smith
 Manganinnie, an Australian 1980 film
 The Nightingale, an Australian 2018 film
 Tunnerminnerwait
 Australian frontier wars

References

Bibliography

Further reading

External links
 Extract from James Bonwick, Black War of Van Diemen’s Land, London, pp. 154–155 Accessed 15 August 2009

1820s conflicts
1830s conflicts
History of Tasmania
History of Indigenous Australians
Genocides in Oceania-Pacific
History of Australia (1788–1850)
Indigenous Australians in Tasmania
Resistance to the British Empire
Violence against Indigenous Australians